Banco24Horas is a Brazilian interbank network. It is the largest interbank network in Brazil, with a market share of 38% in the country. Operated by Tecban (Tecnologia Bancária S.A.), Banco24Horas offers 11,600 ATMs  in more than 400 Brazilian cities.

As of 2014, its main shareholders are the largest Brazilian banks, where Itaú Unibanco owns 31.58%, Bradesco owns 25.33%, Santander 20.82% and Banco do Brasil 13.53%. Other shareholders are Caixa Econômica Federal (Caixa Participações) which owns 10% and Banorte (extra judicial settlement) with 2.78%.

Members
    American Express
    Accesso Soluções de Pagamento (operates some brands of pre-paid cards)
    Banco Banif
    Banco Bradesco
    Banco Cruzeiro do Sul
    Banco da Amazônia
    Banco do Brasil
    Banco BMG
    Banco Inter
    Banco Neon
    Banco do Nordeste
    Banco Ibi
    Banco Original
    Banco Pan
    Banco Votorantim
    Banese
    Banestes
    Banpará
    Banrisul
    BicBanco
    Banco de Brasília
    Caixa Econômica Federal
    Carrefour Soluções Financeiras
    Cetelem - Aura
    Citibank
    Credicard
    Diners Club
    Banco Itaú
    Losango
    Banco Mercantil do Brasil
    Banco Safra
    Banco Santander
    Sicoob
    Sicredi
    Superbank (operates some pre-paid credit cards. A Banco Santander company)
    Unik

References

External links

 Official website

Banking in Brazil
Banks established in 1982
Financial services companies established in 1982
Financial services companies of Brazil
Interbank networks
1982 establishments in Brazil